The title of Hero of Labour of Mongolia, formerly known as the Hero of Labour of the Mongolian People's Republic, was a state decoration of the Mongolian People's Republic and is an award of Mongolia. It is the highest state award given to those with outstanding achievements in the development of the country.

History 
By the decree of the Presidium of the Great People's Khural of the MPR on 31 December 1956, the title was established. The decree stipulates that the winners of the title will be awarded the Order of Sukhbaatar and the “Golden Soyombo” medal. The first awardee was awarded in 1957 to D. Davaajav, an excavator at the Nalaikh mine. Then, in 1958, N. Byambatsogt, a tractor driver from Yeroogiin State Farm, Z. Ochir, a shepherd from Bulgan Province in 1959, and A. Avirmed, a milkman from the Batsumber state farm, were awarded this title. According to the 1992 Constitution, the name of the country was changed to “Mongolia”, and since then, the similar title of Hero of Labor of Mongolia has been awarded. A total of 170 people were awarded this title.

Recipients 

 Leonid Brezhnev
 Andriyan Nikolayev
 Valentina Tereshkova
 Yumjaagiin Tsedenbal
Jamsrangiin Sambuu
Ivan Presnyakov, Deputy of the Liskinsky District City Council
Maidarjavyn Ganzorig
Soronzonboldyn Battsetseg
Paavan Damdin, former member of the Politburo of the MPRP's Central Committee

References 

Orders, decorations, and medals of Mongolia
Awards established in 1957